The team dressage in equestrian at the 1984 Olympic Games in Los Angeles was held at Santa Anita Racetrack.

Competition format

The team medals were awarded after the Grand-Prix portion of the individual competition. After the Grand-Prix portion of the individual event the three rides of each team were added up and the highest score was the winner, all three scores counted towards the final. Both the team and the individual competitions ran concurrently.

Results

References

Equestrian at the 1984 Summer Olympics